The siege of Schleswig lasted for several months, it saw forces under the East-Danish Eric II together with German troops under Lothair III and Adolf of Holstein, facing of against King Niels I and his son Magnus the Strong.

Eric failed in breaking the siege, as Niels succeeded in detering and sowing dissent between the allies, only Adolf of Holstein remained but his forces were crushed.

Background 
Since the age of Charlemagne, has the security of the southern border been, of immense importance to the functioning of state throughout the Danish realm, therefore around 800 that very border would be transformed into a range of dikes and fortresses. To secure all north of it from further incursion, it would therefore also prove prudent to have good relations with the southern hegemon, this beginning with Canute the Great, and continuing through Canute Lavard. Alas unlike Canute the Great, Lavard was considered by the Germans as one of them, his etiquette, culture and personality deeply reflected this, Canute Lavard was on top of this a vassal of the Holy Roman Empire, he was the duke of Holstein and was the man who had reigned in the Obotrites, he was also a dear friend to the King and Queen of Germany - any harm to him, would be tantamount to slighting the German Lothair III, a direct challenge to his competence as a ruler. In other words, when Magnus murdered Duke Canute and was welcomed back after a brief exile, war with the Germans was inevitable. When Eric II not only marched an army north to meet his own, but also dragged troops out of southern Jutland, the opportunity showed itself, if Niels could effectively crush Eric and scatter his troops to the north, he could sweep through the duchy securing supplylies and more importantly the Dannevirke - thereby preventing a German invasion. After defeating his Nephew, Niels gathered more forces in the northern parts of Jutland - meanwhile his son Magnus marched south with a large force, Eric quickly recuperating from his earlier defeat gathered his navy and sailed for his half-brothers capital Slesvig - which commanded the crossing of the Dannevirke.

The siege 
It seems all forces were racing for Slesvig, as all armies arrived shortly within the time of the others. Magnus the Strong came first, he quickly manned the Dannevirke, had the dikes expanded, ordered wooden palisades built, together with other defensive works, Eric arriving shortly after only had naval superiority, and so had no real way of dislodging his foes. The Jutlanding levy having finally been gathered Niels reinforced his son, just in time as well for his sudden reinforcement halted the attack of Lothair III, who had recently crossed the Eider river with 6000 men, among them a large Holsatian force commandeered by Adolf II. With near parity in number and the rumblings of rebellion to the south, Lothair jugded it wisest to treat with Niels and Magnus, both very agreeable, giving in to many demands from the empire, making them vassals, and paying a heavy fine, this treaty was then ratified, moreover a secret part of the treaty would resubjugate the Danish church to that of Bremen. An enraged Eric sails for Lothairs camp, here he insults and shames him and his retainers, Lothair promises future aid, Eric manages to convince Adolf of Holstein to stay - likely committing to a joint attack, the forces of Adolf cross the Eider, here they are quickly pinned down by Magnus, Adolf and his forces are pinned against the river and many are killed or drown. Meanwhile, whatever breakthrough Eric had attempted failed miserably and his forces completely defeated, he hunkers down for the winter - any hope of holding onto Slesvig lost - what few ships he had left, what be hemmed in by the winter freezing the Fjords completely. At the cusp of spring Eric and a few of his retainers managed to escape, Niels and Magnus taking the Township shortly afterwards, completing their conquest of Jutland.

Aftermath 
The siege was a heavy defeat for Eric, Niels now had complete control in Jutland and Funen, he had also secured the southern threat meaning he can focus his forces in the east, and unlike his Uncle who likely possessed over 50 years of military experience, Eric had not commanded armies before and each time he had he was met with defeat. Niels now needed only to consolidate his position and cross the Danish Straits, even though he was still outnumbered he was evening the odds more with each year, the siege though a victory - was in many ways a political blunder. Asser, the Archbishop of Lund, would catch on to the secret term of the treaty - that being the end of his Archdiocese, one that had been his lives work to establish and empower.

Sources 

12th century in Denmark
Jellinge Heath
Jellinge Heath
Sieges involving Denmark
Lothair III, Holy Roman Emperor